Nordstar or variant, may refer to:

 NordStar (НордСтар), a Russian airline based in Norilsk, Russia
 Nordstar Tower (Нордстар Тауэр), a skyscraper in Moscow, Russia
 NordStar Capital, a private equity firm which owns the TorStar group, parent of the newspaper Toronto Star

See also

 Nord (disambiguation)
 Star (disambiguation)
 Estrella del norte (disambiguation)
 Estrela do Norte (disambiguation)
 Étoile du Nord (disambiguation)
 Nordstern (disambiguation)
 Northstar (disambiguation)
 North Star (disambiguation)
 Northern Star (disambiguation)
 Star of the North (disambiguation)